The Taifa of Guadix and Baza was a medieval Moorish taifa kingdom. It existed from 1145 to 1151, when it was conquered by the Taifa of Murcia.

List of Emirs

Malyanid dynasty

Ahmed ibn Muhammed ibn Malyan al-Muta'yyad: 1145–1151

1151 disestablishments
States and territories established in 1145
Guadix and Baza